Stefan Müller (born 9 November 1988 in Karlsruhe) is a German footballer who plays for KSV Hessen Kassel.

Müller made his debut for Karlsruher SC on 3 April 2010, in a 1–1 away draw against 1. FC Union Berlin, after coming off the bench to replace Anton Fink in the 89th minute.

References

External links
 
 

1988 births
Living people
Footballers from Karlsruhe
German footballers
Association football defenders
2. Bundesliga players
Karlsruher SC players
Karlsruher SC II players
KSV Hessen Kassel players